Eypak (also Romanized as Āypak, Epīk , and Īpak) is a village in Eypak Rural District of the Central District of Eshtehard County, Alborz province, Iran. At the 2006 census, its population was 652 in 165 households. At the most recent census in 2016, the population of the village was 781 in 222 households; it is the largest village in its rural district.

References 

Eshtehard County

Populated places in Alborz Province

Populated places in Eshtehard County